"So You Say" is the second and final single taken from Siobhán Donaghy's second studio album, Ghosts. It was co-written by Siobhan and producer–programmer James Sanger. The song was written about Donaghy's first relationship and the breakdown of it. Adam, although not the name of her love, was chosen, due to its biblical references, and the fact that Adam is a common name, so people can relate to it. Donaghy has said the song is a way of almost feeling sorry for herself. The single was also the final release from Ghosts, as well as her final single with Parlophone.

Reception
The single was released on 18 June 2007, with the album Ghosts following on 25 June 2007. Siobhán first previewed the song on 24 March 2007 where she sang an acoustic version on Capital FM. However, the final album version is very different from the acoustic version. The single charted at #76 in the United Kingdom, due to a lack of promotion.

Music video
The music video sees Siobhán walking through a mysterious house filled with winding corridors, and entering various rooms whilst following a strange man named "Adam". She is featured in a room with almost motionless birds and in another with shattered glass floating around her. Near the end of the video, Siobhan confronts "Adam", who seems to be almost "possessed" with his eyes and mouth glowing. She then kisses him and becomes "possessed" herself as seen in the screenshot. The video was filmed in an old magistrates' court. It was said to be inspired by the film Inland Empire, directed by David Lynch.

Track listing
 UK CD single #1 and Digital download EP #1
 "So You Say" - 3:54
 "Don't Take Me Back" - 4:23

 UK CD single #2
 "So You Say" - 3:54
 "Don't Give It Up" (Robert Cory Remix) - 2:07
 "So You Say" (Acoustic) - 3:44
 "So You Say" (Video) - 3:54
 "So You Say" (Behind The Scenes) - 2:00

 12" vinyl and Digital download EP #2
 "So You Say" - 3:54
 "Don't Give It Up" (Carl Craig Vox Remix) - 9:07

 Digital download EP #3
 "So You Say" - 3:54
 "Don't Give It Up" (Robert Cory Remix) - 2:07
 "So You Say" (Acoustic) - 3:44

 Digital download EP #4
 "So You Say" - 3:54
 "So You Say" (Patrick Wolf Remix) - 4:11
 "So You Say" (Robert Logan Remix) - 4:58

Charts

References

External links
"So You Say" music video

2007 singles
Siobhán Donaghy songs
Songs written by Siobhán Donaghy
Songs written by James Sanger
2007 songs
Parlophone singles